"Angel" is a song by English musician Goldie, released in 1995 as second single from his debut album, Timeless. The song was originally published as a single in 1993 by British label Synthetic Records and credited to Goldie's moniker "Metalheads". The subsequent re-release reached number 41 on the UK Singles Chart on 9 September 1995. The song features vocals from Goldie's frequent collaborator Diane Charlemagne. While "Angel" uses time stretching sample technique and soul vocals, its remixed version "Saint Angel" is more hardcore techno-influenced. It was released both on "Angel" single and album Timeless.

Critical reception 
Music & Media commented, "Now that jungle has taken the clubs and charts by storm, British artist Goldie has re-released 1993's Angel, a slow hypnotic track featuring singer Diane Charlemagne (Urban Cookie Collective)." Music Week rated it three out of five, adding, "In the same vein as Inner City Life, this is not the most commercial jungle track around, but is mellow enough to appeal to beginners. An authentic introduction to the genre and a booster for Goldie's recently-released debut album Timeless."

Track listing 
 "Angel" (album version) – 4:59
 "Saint Angel" (original mix) – 4:29
 "Angel" (Peshay Back from Narm mix) – 9:06

Some versions do not include third track or include album version of "Saint Angel" as fourth track.

Personnel 
 Design, CGI artist – Sam
 Design concept, art direction – Goldie
 Management – N.U.R. Entertainment, Trenton Harrison
 Writing, production – Goldie
 Co-production – Rob Playford, Mark Mac and Dego (4hero).
 Vocals – Diane Charlemagne

Charts

References

External links 

1995 singles
1995 songs
Goldie songs